The 1940 Toledo Rockets football team was an American football team that represented Toledo University in the Ohio Athletic Conference during the 1940 college football season. In their fifth season under head coach Clarence Spears, the Rockets compiled a 6–3 record.

Schedule

References

Toledo
Toledo Rockets football seasons
Toledo Rockets football